Sgùrr a' Mhaoraich is a Scottish mountain located to the north of Loch Quoich in the north western highlands. It has a height of 1027 m (3369 ft) and is classed as a Munro. Viewed from Kinloch Hourn to the west, or from the north, it shows large, steep, rocky flanks with a complex series of ridges and corries, but like its neighbours such as Gleouraich, its southern side is gentler and grassier.

The mountain was originally known as Sgùrr a' Mhoraire, meaning peak of the landowner, but has been changed on modern maps to Sgùrr a' Mhaoraich, which may be derived from the Gaelic maorach meaning shellfish. This may be a reference to the hill's ribbed summit, which has been said to resemble a shell.

The mountain is most commonly climbed from the shores of Loch Quioch to the south. A stalker's path leads up the Bac nan Canaichean ridge to the subsidiary top of Sgùrr Coire nan Eiricheallach, which is connected to the main summit by a 1.5 km ridge, which has a number of rocky outcrops which can be scrambled over or bypassed. An alternative, and less frequently climbed route is from the northeast end of Glen Quoich, by way of a stalker's path which runs the length of Coire a' Carorainn and to the rocky summit of An Bathaich, and from there south to Sgùrr a' Mhaoraich via a high bealach.

References

Munros
Marilyns of Scotland
Mountains and hills of the Northwest Highlands
One-thousanders of Scotland